Jamaica Avenue is a major avenue in the New York City boroughs of Brooklyn and Queens, New York, in the United States. Jamaica Avenue's western end is at Broadway and Fulton Street, as a continuation of East New York Avenue, in Brooklyn's East New York neighborhood. Physically, East New York Avenue connects westbound to New York Avenue, where East New York Avenue changes names another time to Lincoln Road; Lincoln Road continues to Ocean Avenue in the west, where it ends. Its eastern end is at the city line in Bellerose, Queens, where it becomes Jericho Turnpike to serve the rest of Long Island. The section of Jamaica Avenue designated as New York State Route 25 runs from Braddock Avenue to the city line, where Jamaica Avenue becomes Jericho Turnpike.

History
Jamaica Avenue was part of a pre-Columbian trail for tribes from as far away as the Ohio River and the Great Lakes, coming to trade skins and furs for wampum. It was in 1655 that the first settlers paid the Native Americans with two guns, a coat, and some powder and lead, for the land lying between the old trail and "Beaver Pond", later Baisley Pond. Dutch Director-General Peter Stuyvesant dubbed the area "Rustdorp" in granting the 1656 land patent. The English, who took control of the colony in 1664, renamed the little settlement "Jameco", for the Jameco (or Yamecah) Native Americans.

During the early 19th century, the old road through Jamaica Pass was the Brooklyn Ferry Road; at mid-century this became the Brooklyn and Jamaica Plank Road, with toll booths. Late in the century the portion west of Jamaica Pass became Fulton Street, and the eastern portion Jamaica Avenue.''

Commerce 
The part of Jamaica Avenue that runs through Jamaica, Queens is an important shopping street, and is on par with Brooklyn's Fulton Street.  Prices are said to be low, in an exciting market place atmosphere.  It is also the historic center of the former village with several city landmarks including the King Manor.

Jamaica Avenue is also the main shopping street for many other neighborhoods it runs through as well, including Woodhaven, Richmond Hill, and Queens Village.

Transportation
Jamaica Avenue is the starting point of many newer streets in Queens, such as Myrtle Avenue, Metropolitan Avenue, Hempstead Avenue, Guy R. Brewer Boulevard, Farmers Boulevard, and Queens Boulevard. Many bus lines run down Jamaica Avenue, most notably the Q56, Q110, and Q36.  The New York City Subway's BMT Jamaica Line runs above Jamaica Avenue through the Cypress Hills section of Brooklyn along with Woodhaven and Richmond Hill. The Jamaica Bus Depot and East New York Bus Depot are located near the avenue.

Despite a deadline of October 2020, the Jamaica Avenue busway was not in place at that time. Furthermore, transportation advocates did support a bus lane in downtown Jamaica, but they preferred a bus lane on the busier Archer Avenue corridor, which parallels Jamaica Avenue to the south.

Jamaica Avenue intersects with other former country roads in Queens which have become important urban streets, including Woodhaven Boulevard, Lefferts Boulevard, Sutphin Boulevard, Parsons Boulevard, Francis Lewis Boulevard, and Springfield Boulevard.

The Jamaica Center–Parsons/Archer station with its associated bus station is a major transport hub, a rival to the nearby Jamaica–179th Street station on Hillside Avenue.

Major intersections

References

External links
 A Walk down Jamaica Avenue Photoessay
 Jamaica Plank Road - Jamaica Avenue (Richmond Hill Historical Society) 

Streets in Queens, New York
Streets in Brooklyn
Cypress Hills, Brooklyn
East New York, Brooklyn
Jamaica, Queens